Peptoniphilus indolicus is a bacterium in the family of Peptoniphilaceae.

References 

Peptoniphilaceae
Bacteria described in 1934